Gertrude Dolores Messinger (April 28, 1911 – November 8, 1995) was an American film actress known for her B-movie roles from the 1930s through the 1950s. She began as a child actor in silent films, but found her greatest fame in talkies of the 1930s. During her career she appeared in more than 50 motion pictures, with particular success in westerns.

Biography 

Born in Spokane, Washington, she began acting early, playing child roles in silent films as early as 1917, when she had a role in the film Babes in the Woods. Fellow child actor Buddy Messinger was her brother. Her name was sometimes spelled Gertrude Messenger and she was also known as Gertie Messinger.

During the 1930s her career took off, with significant roles in more than 30 films. Her earliest starring roles were in 1932 when she starred opposite Bob Steele in Riders of the Desert, and opposite Lane Chandler in Lawless Valley. For the remainder of the 1930s, she was fairly active in films.

In 1934, she played a major part in arguably her biggest movie Anne of Green Gables, with the starring role being played by actress Dawn O'Day (later known as Anne Shirley). Her most active year was 1935 when she starred in eight feature films, most notably The Fighting Pilot with Richard Talmadge and Wagon Trail opposite Harry Carey.

In April 1932, the 20-year-old actress fled her fiancé and eloped with actor Dave Sharpe. In 1939, she married cameraman Schuyler Sanford, who later won an Oscar for his work on the film Around the World in 80 Days.

Her career slowed considerably in the 1940s, but she continued to act, mostly in uncredited roles. Her last credited role was in the 1949 film Joe Palooka in the Counterpunch. In 1952, she played in her last film, The Greatest Show on Earth, which was uncredited. She appeared in a total of 52 films in her career, 11 of which were Western films.

Death
Gertrude Messinger died of congestive heart failure on November 8, 1995, aged 84.

Selected filmography

 A Bit o' Heaven (1917) - A Raggedy Ruggles
 Jack and the Beanstalk (1917)
 Aladdin and the Wonderful Lamp (1917) - Yasmini
 The Babes in the Woods (1917)
 Treasure Island (1917)
 The Girl with the Champagne Eyes (1918) - Miner's Child
 Fan Fan (1918)
 Ali Baba and the Forty Thieves (1918) - Morgiianna
 Miss Adventure (1919) - Jane, as a child
 The Luck of the Irish (1920) - The Kid's Romance
 Rip Van Winkle (1921) - Meenie Van Winkle, as a child
 Penrod and Sam (1923) - Marjorie Jones
 The Barefoot Boy (1923) - Mary Truesdale - as a Child
 The Jazz Age (1929) - Marjorie
 The Duke Steps Out (1929) - College Girl (uncredited)
 Two Weeks Off (1929) - Tessie McCann
 The Rampant Age (1930) - Julie
 The Boy Friends (1930-1932, Short) - Gertie
 Sinister Hands (1932) - Betty Lang
 Lawless Valley (1932) - Rosita
 Riders of the Desert (1932) - Barbara
 Madame Racketeer (1932) - Patsy Hicks
 Hidden Valley (1932) - Joyce Lanners
 The Woman Accused (1933) - Evelyn Craig
 He Learned About Women (1933) - Minor Role (uncredited)
 Bondage (1933) - (uncredited)
 Diamond Trail (1933) - Blonde Secretary (uncredited)
 Love Past Thirty (1934) - Zelda Burt
 Hat, Coat, and Glove (1934) - Elevator Operator (uncredited)
 The Age of Innocence (1934) - Ship Passenger (uncredited)
 Anne of Green Gables (1934) - Diana
 The Fighting Pilot (1935) - Jean Reynolds
 Wagon Trail (1935) - Joan Collins
 Roaring Roads (1935) - Gertrude 'Gertie' McDowell
 Social Error (1935) - June Merton
 Rustler's Paradise (1935) - Connie
 Adventurous Knights (1935) - Princess Carmencita
 The Rider of the Law (1935) - Ann Carver
 Melody Trail (1935) - Cowgirl Cuddles
 Blazing Justice (1936) - Virginia Peterson
 The Return of Jimmy Valentine (1936) - Blonde (uncredited)
 The Drag-Net (1936) - Switchboard Operator (uncredited)
 The Border Patrolman (1936) - Telephone Operator (uncredited)
 Our Relations (1936) - Pirate's Club Customer (uncredited)
 Aces Wild (1936) - Martha Worth
 Rose Bowl (1936) - Girl (uncredited)
 Wild Brian Kent (1936) - Operator (uncredited)
 Secret Valley (1937) - Martin's Secretary (uncredited)
 King of Gamblers (1937) - Telephone Operator (uncredited)
 Atlantic Flight (1937) - Mary (uncredited)
 Carnival Queen (1937) - Small Young Woman (uncredited)
 Feud of the Range (1939) - Madge Allen
 Zenobia (1939) - Party Guest (uncredited)
 Our Leading Citizen (1939) - Phone Operator (uncredited)
 The Great Victor Herbert (1939) - Barney's Secretary (uncredited)
 Ride, Tenderfoot, Ride (1940) - Miss Robinson (uncredited)
 Gambling Daughters (1941) - Jane
 Niagara Falls (1941) - Telephone Operator (uncredited)
 The Miracle Kid (1941) - Marge
 Pardon My Stripes (1942) - Telephone Operator (uncredited)
 Syncopation (1942) - Bride (uncredited)
 Redhead from Manhattan (1943) - Club Patron (uncredited)
 Destroyer (1943) - Girl (uncredited)
 Joe Palooka in the Counterpunch (1949) - Nurse
 Samson and Delilah (1949) - (uncredited)
 Sunset Boulevard (1950) - Hairdresser (uncredited)
 The Greatest Show on Earth (1952) - Gertrude (uncredited) (final film role)

References

External links 

Heroines, Gertrude Messinger

1911 births
1995 deaths
20th-century American actresses
Actresses from Spokane, Washington
American film actresses
Burials at Forest Lawn Memorial Park (Hollywood Hills)
American child actresses
Western (genre) film actresses
American silent film actresses